Ōhikari Sadayuki (September 24, 1927 – January 14, 1996, real name Sadayuki Shibata) was a sumo wrestler and coach from Kamiiso, Hokkaido, Japan. He made his professional debut in January 1944, reaching the top makuuchi division in 1950. His highest rank was komusubi. He was a runner-up in the May 1956 tournament and earned five kinboshi or gold stars for defeating yokozuna during his career. He retired in 1963 and became an elder of the Japan Sumo Association under the name Ōnomatsu Oyakata, working as a coach at Dewanoumi stable. He died in 1996 at the age of 68.

Career
His first job after graduating from school was as a driver but he had a large physique which was well suited to sumo, and he was recruited by future yokozuna Chiyonoyama, who came from nearby Fukushima. He joined Dewanoumi stable in January 1944. Originally fighting under his own surname of Shibata, he reached the jūryō division in January 1949 and adopted the shikona of Ōhikari in January 1950. He reached the top makuuchi division in September of that year. In September 1952 he defeated his first yokozuna, Azumafuji, although he finished the tournament with only four wins against eleven losses. His best result in a tournament was in May 1956 when he was runner-up to then ōzeki Wakanohana Kanji I, losing to him in a playoff for the yūshō or championship after both wrestlers finished with identical 12–3 records. He had fought only his fellow maegashira ranked wrestlers until the final day, when he defeated sekiwake Tsurugamine. Ōhikari was awarded the Fighting Spirit sanshō or special prize, the only one of his career. He made his debut in the sanyaku ranks at komusubi in July 1958, but fell just short of a majority of wins with a 7–8 record. He had one more appearance at komusubi in November 1958.

He was known for his endurance and ability to avoid injury, and on the seventh day of the January 1963 tournament, he became the first wrestler to fight 1000 consecutive matches from his professional debut. He extended this record to 1068 matches, but a ruptured Achilles tendon in  November 1963 ended his streak, and he immediately announced his retirement. 945 of those bouts had been in the top division, which is the seventh longest consecutive run of makuuchi bouts as of 2017. He had fought in the top division for 13 years and 64 tournaments, with 455 wins against 489 losses, and one draw. He had five gold stars, his yokozuna wins coming against Azumafuji, Kagamisato, and Wakanohana I (three times). Despite fighting in 79 career tournaments, he never managed to win a championship in any division.

Retirement from sumo
Ōhikari stayed in sumo as  an elder of the Japan Sumo Association, working as a coach at Dewanoumi stable under the name of Ōnomatsu Oyakata until reaching the mandatory retirement age of 65 in September 1992. He sold his Ōnomatsu stock to former sekiwake Masurao, who went on to found Ōnomatsu stable. He died in January 1996 at the age of 68.

Fighting style
Ōhikari  liked to push and thrust at his opponents, and was known for the power of his tsuppari, a series of rapid thrusts to the chest. His most common winning kimarite or techniques were yori kiri (force out), utchari (ring edge throw) and oshi-dashi (push out).

Pre-modern top division record
The New Year tournament began and the Spring tournament returned to Osaka in 1953.

Modern top division tournament record
Since the addition of the Kyushu tournament in 1957 and the Nagoya tournament in 1958, the yearly schedule has remained unchanged.

See also
List of past sumo wrestlers
List of komusubi
Glossary of sumo terms

References

1927 births
1996 deaths
Japanese sumo wrestlers
Sumo people from Hokkaido
Komusubi